Regina (Latin for "queen") may refer to:

Places

Canada
 Regina, Saskatchewan, the capital city of the province
 Regina (electoral district)
 Roman Catholic Archdiocese of Regina

France
 Régina, French Guiana, a commune

United States
 Regina, Minneapolis, Minnesota, a neighborhood
 Regina, Missouri, an unincorporated community
 Regina, New Mexico, a census-designated place
 Regina, Virginia, an unincorporated community
 Regina, Wisconsin, an unincorporated community

Persons 

Regina (name)
Regina (concubine), 8th century French concubine of Charlemagne
Regina (martyr), 3rd century French martyr
Regina (American singer), American singer
Regina (Slovenian singer) (born 1965), Slovenian singer
Regina King, (born 1971), American actress and director
Regina "Queen" Saraiva (born 1968), Eurodance singer with stage name of Regina

Arts, entertainment, and media

Groups
Regina (Bosnia and Herzegovina band), a Bosnian rock band
Regina (Finnish band). a Finnish synth-pop band
Regina Regina, an American country music duo

Other uses in arts, entertainment, and media
Regina (album), 2003 album based on the eponymous play 
Regina (film)
Regina (film), 
Regina (Lortzing), 1848 opera by Albert Lortzing, first performed in 1899
Regina (Blitzstein), a 1948 opera by Marc Blitzstein
Regina (play), a 1997 Mexican musical
"Regina", a 1989 song by the Sugarcubes
"Regina Caeli", an antiphon of the Roman-Rite liturgy

Ships

Regina, a New Zealand Company schooner built at Plymouth in 1841 and wrecked in New Plymouth that same year
, a Royal Canadian Navy shipname
, a name used by several steamships

Other uses

50th Infantry Division Regina, an Italian infantry division of World War II
Hôtel Regina, a hotel in Paris
Regina Company, a US manufacturer of mechanical musical instruments
Regina (pottery), Dutch art pottery manufactured by Kunstaardewerkfabriek Regina
Regina (snake), a genus of colubrid snakes
Regina (train), a Swedish model of passenger train
Regina, an implementation of Rexx

See also
Queen consort, a title given to the wife of a reigning king
Queen regnant, a female monarch possessing and exercising all the powers of a head of state
Reggina Calcio, an Italian football club
Regine